Frederick Mwita Werema (born 10 October 1955) served as Attorney General of Tanzania from 2009 until his resignation in 2014. Before his appointment Werema was High Court of Tanzania Judge in the Commercial Division.

Early life and career
Judge Werema was born on 10 October 1955 and acquired his lLaw degrees from the University of Dar es Salaam, American University Graduate School in USA, Italy on Contracts, the United Kingdom and Bolivia where he learned how to privatize electricity companies.

He had previously worked in the Attorney General's Office  from 1984 to 2007. In 2005 he was appointed an alternate member of SADC Tribunal before that in 1999, as Director of Constitutional Affairs and Human Rights.

Attorney General
He was sworn in on October 20, 2009 at the State House.

He resigned in December 2014 after he was accused of authorizing the transfer of about $120 million from a controversial escrow account. Werema stated that his advice had been misunderstood.

References

External links
 Calls for prosecution as AG Werema quits, The Citizen

1954 births
Living people
21st-century Tanzanian judges
Attorneys General of Tanzania
Tanzanian MPs 2010–2015
University of Dar es Salaam alumni
American University alumni
People associated with Shaaban Robert Secondary School